Chained to the City is the debut EP by American hip hop recording artist Kevin Gates. It was released on May 14, 2018 via Bread Winners Association and Atlantic Records.

Release

The project was released without any prior announcement. It is Gates' first project release since being released from prison in January 2018.

The first music video of the project is "Change Lanes", it was released on May 16, 2018 and directed by Cole Bennett. The music video of "Let It Sing" was released June 5, 2018. The music video of "Vouch" was released on August 6, 2018.

Track listing

References

2018 debut EPs
Kevin Gates albums